Burchard III (c. 91512 November 973), a member of the Hunfriding dynasty, was the count of Thurgau and Zürichgau, perhaps of Rhaetia, and then Duke of Swabia from 954 to his death.

He was the son of Burchard II, Duke of Swabia and Regilinda. At a young age on the murder of his father in 926, he was sent to Saxony for his safety after the accession of the duke Herman I. In Saxony, he married a member of the Immedinger family. From this marriage came two sons: Theodoric, count of Wettin, and Burchard, count of Liesgau. His second marriage was to Hedwig, daughter of Henry I, Duke of Bavaria. Burchard built the great fortress atop the Hohentwiel, and Hedwige was the foundress of the monastery of St. George there, but their marriage remained childless.

After the rebellion of Duke Liudolf, son of King Otto I, in 954, the king bestowed the ducal title on his nephew-in-law Burchard at a general council at Arnstadt. Burchard was an intimate of Otto and his queen, Adelaide of Italy. He was often at the royal court and he accompanied Otto on his campaign against the Magyars and was present at the great Battle of the Lechfeld on 10 August 955.

In 965, he led a third campaign against Berengar II in Italy. At the Battle of the Po on 25 June, Burchard defeated Berengar's son, Adalbert, and restored Italy to Ottonian control, even the south Italian principalities were brought to heel by 972. In 973, he died and was buried in the chapel of Saint Erasmus in the monastery on Reichenau Island in Lake Constance. He was succeeded by Otto, son of Liudolf.

Notes

References

Sources

Dukes of Swabia
910s births
973 deaths
10th-century rulers in Europe
Year of birth uncertain
Burials in Baden-Württemberg
Burials at the Imperial Abbey of Reichenau
Hunfridings